Boyer River is a tributary of the Missouri River.

Boyer River may also refer to:

 Boyer River (Alberta)
 Boyer River (Quebec), a small river that empties into the Saint Lawrence River

See also 
 Boy River, the name of a city and a river in Minnesota